Isabella May Ramsey (born September 2003) is an English actor. She is known for her breakout role as young noblewoman Lyanna Mormont in the HBO fantasy television series Game of Thrones (2016–2019), and subsequent television roles as Mildred Hubble in the 2017 CBBC series The Worst Witch, the voice of the title character in the Netflix animated series Hilda (2018present
), and Jane Grey in the 2022 Starz drama Becoming Elizabeth.

She starred in the 2022 historical comedy film Catherine Called Birdy and currently stars as Ellie in the 2023 HBO drama series The Last of Us.

Early life  

Isabella May Ramsey was born in Nottingham in September 2003. She was schooled online through InterHigh School. She started acting as a hobby at the age of four, through the Loughborough branch of Stagecoach Theatre Arts, which she attended for seven years. Ramsey then went to the Television Workshop and began auditioning for professional roles.

Career 

From 2016 to 2019, Ramsey portrayed Lyanna Mormont in the HBO fantasy drama television series Game of Thrones. The part is Ramsey's first credited role. After her debut appearance in "The Broken Man" (season 6, episode 7), fans and critics noted Ramsey was a standout actor for portraying her character's no-nonsense leadership style. This reaction was repeated after her appearance in the season finale, with The Hollywood Reporter calling her "season 6's breakout star". Ramsey continued in the role for the series' seventh and eighth seasons.

Ramsey starred in the 2017 TV adaptation of The Worst Witch books, as the titular character Mildred Hubble, for which she won the Young Performer award at the 2019 British Academy Children's Awards. Ramsey announced on Instagram that she had left the series in 2020 due to mental health problems. Her role was recast with Lydia Page for the fourth and final season.

Since 2018, Ramsey has voiced the title character in the 2018 Netflix original series Hilda, for which she won the 2019 BAFTA award for best "Children's Animation" along with Luke Pearson, Kurt Mueller, and Stephanie Simpson. The series marked the debut of Ramsey's singing talent, with her debut song "The Life of Hilda" released on 25 November 2020, and later on 14 December 2020 along with the release of the show's second season. She reprised the role of Hilda in the 80-minute movie special, Hilda and the Mountain King, which premiered on 30 December 2021.

In February 2021, Ramsey was cast in the lead role of Ellie for the HBO adaptation of the 2013 video game The Last of Us alongside fellow Game of Thrones alumnus Pedro Pascal. In 2021 she appeared in the lesbian horror short film Requiem alongside Safia Oakley-Green.

Personal life 

Ramsey identifies as non-binary and is indifferent to which pronouns are used for her, telling The New York Times, "I'm very much just a person. Being gendered isn't something that I particularly like, but in terms of pronouns, I really couldn't care less."

Ramsey describes herself as a Christian, saying that her faith helped her when she was struggling with anorexia nervosa. In 2020, she ran a YouTube channel and related Instagram account called United Hope where she shared her faith. Ramsey plays the guitar and sings.

Filmography

Film

Television

Video games

Radio & podcasts

Discography

Awards and nominations

Notes

References

External links

 
 

2003 births
Living people
21st-century British actors
21st-century English actors
21st-century LGBT people
Actors from Nottingham
Actors from Nottinghamshire
British child actors
British film actors
British non-binary actors
British television actors
British voice actors
Genderfluid people
English Christians
LGBT Christians
British singers
British guitarists